M.I.S.S.I.O.N. is a role-playing game published by Kabal Gaming Systems in 1982.

Description
M.I.S.S.I.O.N. is an espionage system. The game includes a rulebook (that covers mainly skills and combat), maps, floor plans, and cardstock building pieces.

Publication history
M.I.S.S.I.O.N. was designed by Ernest T. Hams and published by Kabal Gaming Systems in 1982 as a boxed set including a 16-page digest-sized book, seven color maps, four floor-plan sheets, and four cardstock sheets.

Reception
Lawrence Schick cautioned: "you'll need a calculator to perform some of the complex calculations required in these rules".

References

Espionage role-playing games
Role-playing games introduced in 1982